World's Strictest Parents is an American reality television series that first aired on April 18, 2009, on CMT and concluded on December 17, 2010.

The series is based on the original British version of The World's Strictest Parents that was first aired on BBC in 2008.

Synopsis
The program shows two troubled teens are sent to live with strict host families within one week in order to attempt to change their attitudes, outlooks, and behaviors in general. The teens will follow the house rules such as dress code policy, no-smoking zone, coarse swearing, and attitudes by the strict host parents within one week. The strict host parents will confiscate the box of cigarettes or cigarettes, alcoholic beverages such as beer, liquor, and vodka, and electronic devices such as iPods and cellphones from two teenagers before entering the house. The teens will break the house rules including backtalk to the strict parents, using profanity towards to the children and parents, smoking cigarettes, and not following the house rules, they will face the consequences such as dip on the pond, walking around by carrying a water slosh-pipe, push-ups, cutting a red-painted stump, running around the cones, cleaning the manure, extra chores, boot camp, staying outside of the porch on cold weather and other numerous punishments by the strict host parents. During the week they receive an impact letter from their real parents with a list of issues they should try to resolve.

Unlike the original British series, in which teenagers were usually sent to live abroad, the American series had the teenagers remain within the parts of the United States for five days, as the program was produced with a reduced cable network budget rather than that of a national broadcast network, and law and passport concerns as some episodes would likely feature subjects which would not meet passport regulations. Another difference was that their own parents came for them and evaluated the stay with the host family at the end of every episode.

Syndication
The success of the program led to many overseas versions being created including in the Americas (broadcast by CMT) (part of MTV Networks) the CMT episodes frequently rebroadcasting on MTV.

Seasons

Season 1 (2009–2010)

Season 2 (2010)

References

External links
, Country Music Television

CMT (American TV channel) original programming
American television series based on British television series
English-language television shows
2009 American television series debuts
2010 American television series endings
2000s American reality television series
2010s American reality television series
Television series about teenagers
Television series by Warner Bros. Television Studios